The First Dudley Senanayake cabinet was the central government of Ceylon led by Prime Minister Dudley Senanayake between 1952 and 1953. It was formed in March 1952 after the death of Senanayake's predecessor D. S. Senanayake and it ended in October 1953 with Senanayake's resignation.

Cabinet members

Parliamentary secretaries

See also
 Cabinet Office (Sri Lanka)
 Hartal 1953

Notes

References

1952 establishments in Ceylon
1953 disestablishments in Ceylon
Cabinets disestablished in 1953
Cabinets established in 1952
Cabinet of Sri Lanka
Ministries of Elizabeth II